Kernot was a railway station in Victoria, Australia, built on the Wonthaggi railway line. Not long after the line opened the station was equipped with a 10,000-gallon tank and crane, and was located within walking distance of the Kernot General Store which closed at the same time as the line did in 1978.

History 

Following trial surveys of the route conducted in 1901, the new line was built from Loch, Victoria, to service various farms in the district. The station was built by the Nyora and Woolamai Construction Trust in 1909 and was located in the Bass Coast Shire, Victoria. An extension to Woolamai was included in the early proposal because it could connect with the San Remo and Kilcunda Tramway and the Kernot station was enhanced with a 10,000-gallon tank and crane after the line opened. By 1915 the station saw more traffic than any other station between Daylston and Nyora, leading to proposals for the construction of a 15-room hotel opposite the store.

Shortly after opening a serious accident occurred when a goods train from Nyora crashed into a coal train waiting on the siding at the station. Both engines were derailed and severely damaged, although both crews escaped injury. Rescue teams worked throughout the night and into the next day to clear the debris.

The station's construction site had earlier been surveyed and acquired without objection under the Railway Lands Acquisition Act of 1893 by the authority of the Nyora and Woolamai Railway Construction Act, with the proviso that the line run inland from Nyora and not along the coast from Lang Lang. Later, many proponents of this inland railway felt somewhat deceived when the proposed route acquired so much of their fertile land (up to 50 yards on either side of the line) and did not pass within a mile of Almurta Township  due to land gradients. Petitions to Parliament and requests to the shire engineer were submitted to independently survey the route and take it through the cheaper hills where the land was worth only £5 per acre (rather than flatlands worth up to £40 per acre). The use of these flatlands greatly contributed to the line's retention five years after its opening (see Woodleigh railway station).

The station was originally called Almurta (Victorian Railways Schedule 1639/10 in Feb 1910) when it serviced the coal line but was temporarily renamed McKenzie (Victorian Railways Schedule 2204/10 May 1910) when it opened for passenger and goods services on the Wonthaggi line on the 9 May 1910. McKenzie was the surname of an officer of the mines department and had been prominently identified with the Powlett Coalfield. As expected, passenger service lasted only a few years, losing £900 per year due to poor patronage.

The station was finally renamed Kernot by the railway commissioners as the original Kernot Station had been named after the chief engineer of the Victorian Railways. It also honored the engineer's recently deceased brother, Professor William Charles Kernot.

Upon the naming of Kernot, the four temporary station names on the line now had their final names: Hunter was known as Woodleigh, McKenzie was Kernot, Rees was Almurta, and the original Kernot was Glen Forbes.

The station closed at the same time as the line in 1978. The retaining wall of the platform is still in fairly good condition and the level crossing on the nearby main road is still visible. The Kernot Railway Station site is Crown Allotment 2058 in the parish of Corinella and is allocated for future use as a reserve and part of the Nyora Wonthaggi Rail Trail.

References

Disused railway stations in Victoria (Australia)
Railway stations in Australia opened in 1910
Railway stations closed in 1978
1978 disestablishments in Australia
Transport in Gippsland (region)
Bass Coast Shire